Lilla Jönssonligan och cornflakeskuppen is a Swedish film, the first out of four films in the Lilla Jönssonligan film series. It was released on 29 November 1996 in Sweden and was directed by Christjan Wegner.

The film has been shown several times on the Swedish television channels SVT1, TV3 and TV4. It was released in Germany on 7 September 2000, as Die Jönnson Bande & der Cornflakes-Raub.

Synopsis
Charles-Ingvar "Sickan" Jönsson is a new student in Dynamit-Harry's and Ragnars's school. He instantly gets bullied by Junior and Biffen for his nerdy looks. The year is 1953 and 'filmisar', small collectible cards with portraits of film stars and celebrities, found in cornflakes' boxes, are popular at the school. Sickan's first heist will be to get as many 'filmisar' as he can by sneaking in to the cornflakes factory with his newly made friends Harry and Ragnar.

Cast
Kalle Eriksson - Charles-Ingvar "Sickan" Jönsson 
Jonathan Flumée - Ragnar Vanheden
Fredrik Glimskär - Dynamit-Harry
Jonna Sohlmér - Doris
Anders Öström - Junior Wall-Enberg
Mats Wennberg - Biffen 
Peter Rangmar - Sigvard Jönsson
Cecilia Nilsson - Tora Jönsson
Isak Ekblom - Sven-Ingvar Jönsson 
Loa Falkman - Oscar Wall-Enberg 
Lena T. Hansson - Lilian Wall-Enberg 
Micke Dubois - Loket
Jerry Williams - Einar Vanheden
Mona Seilitz - Rut Vanheden 
Cecilia Häll - Vivi Vanheden
Olof Thunberg - Morfar Elis

References

External links

Swedish children's films
Jönssonligan films
Swedish comedy films
Films set in the 1950s
1990s Swedish films